Limnaecia magica is a moth in the family Cosmopterigidae. It is found in Sri Lanka.

References

Natural History Museum Lepidoptera generic names catalog

Limnaecia
Moths described in 1905
Taxa named by Edward Meyrick
Moths of Sri Lanka